Saqqarlersuaq Island (old spelling: Sarqardlerssuaq) is an uninhabited island in Avannaata municipality in northwestern Greenland. Part of the Upernavik Archipelago, Saqqarlersuaq Island is located in the southern part of Melville Bay.

Geography 

In the south, Saqqarlersuaq Island is separated from the much larger Kiatassuaq Island by the  Saqqarlersuup Sullua strait. The strait connects the open waters of Melville Bay in the west with the outlet of Alison Bay in the northeast.

A small Ikerasaa Strait separates the island from Kullorsuaq Island in the northwest, home to the Kullorsuaq settlement, the northernmost settlement in the archipelago.

The highest point on the island is an unnamed  peak in the southern part of the island.

References

External links

Uninhabited islands of Greenland
Melville Bay
Islands of the Upernavik Archipelago